Doraville is a train station in Doraville, Georgia, and the northern terminus on the Gold Line of the Metropolitan Atlanta Rapid Transit Authority (MARTA) rail system. Doraville serves as the ground for the Doraville rail yard for the Gold line, with a capacity of 30 rail cars.

This station mainly serves Doravile and Gwinnett County.

This station provides access to Doraville City Hall, Doraville Health Department, Doraville Public Library, and bus service to Sugarloaf Mills (formerly Discover Mills). Bus service is also provided at this station to Oglethorpe University, Buford Highway, Tucker, Phipps Plaza, Peachtree Industrial Boulevard, and Brandsmart USA.

Station layout

Parking
Doraville has 1,070 daily and long term parking spaces available for MARTA users which are located in paved parking lots and one parking deck.

Bus routes
The station is served by the following MARTA bus routes:
 Route 25 - Peachtree Industrial Boulevard
 Route 39 - Buford Highway
 Route 104 - Winters Chapel Road
 Route 124 - Pleasantdale Road
 Route 133 - Shallowford Road

The station is also served by the following:
 Ride Gwinnett routes 10A, 10B, 20, and 35 start at Doraville Station and extend to Gwinnett County.
 Georgia Regional Transportation Authority (GRTA) Xpress route 408 - Doraville to Johns Creek Parkway

Proposed Intercity Rail Service
Amtrak has been considering moving their service for the Atlanta area to a site near this station to replace their current station in the Brookwood neighborhood. While agreements with MARTA and Norfolk Southern are necessary, this would provide the station with a direct connection with Amtrak Crescent service to New York City, Charlotte, Washington, DC, Birmingham, and New Orleans.

The station site is also proposed for possible intercity service on the Southeast High Speed Rail Corridor's Charlotte to Atlanta segment, should a future analysis choose an approach into Atlanta via Norfolk Southern Railway trackage. If the alignment through Doraville is chosen, it is assumed at all trains along the corridor would stop here, due to its connection to the MARTA rail system.

Amtrak had again listed Doraville as a proposed station stop along a corridor route from Charlotte, North Carolina to Atlanta as part of their "Connects US" plan in May 2021. As part of this proposal, three round trips would operate to Charlotte daily, with two of these trips extending to Union Station in Raleigh, North Carolina as an extension of the existing Piedmont service.

References

External links
MARTA station page
nycsubway.org Atlanta page
Armour Yard Online Media Kit
 Station from Google Maps Street View

Doraville, Georgia
Gold Line (MARTA)
Metropolitan Atlanta Rapid Transit Authority stations
Railway stations in the United States opened in 1992
Railway stations in DeKalb County, Georgia
1992 establishments in Georgia (U.S. state)